The 2022–23 Ukrainian Amateur Cup season started on November 9, 2022. It was originally scheduled to start earlier in September with its pool of participants still being not fully determined until November due to war conditions.

Participated clubs
In bold are clubs that are active at the same season AAFU championship (parallel round-robin competition).

 Chernivtsi Oblast (2): Fazenda Chernivtsi, FC Voloka
 Dnipropetrovsk Oblast (1): Penuel Kryvyi Rih
 Ivano-Frankivsk Oblast (1): Varatyk Kolomyia
 Khmelnytskyi Oblast (1): Iskra Teofipol
 Kirovohrad Oblast (1): Zirka Kropyvnytskyi
 Kyiv Oblast (5): Druzhba Myrivka, Lokomotyv Kyiv, Shturm Ivankiv, Tytan Kyiv, UCSA Tarasivka

 Lviv Oblast (1): Skala 1911 Stryi
 Poltava Oblast (1): Olimpiya Savyntsi
 Ternopil Oblast (1): Ahron Velyki Hayi
 Zaporizhzhia Oblast (1): Motor Zaporizhia
 Zhytomyr Oblast (1): Polissia Stavky

Notes
 Last season UCSA Tarasivka competed as UCSA Kyiv.

Results

Round of 16
Many first leg matches were played on 9 November, while two more hosted by Voloka and Shturm were moved to 10 November. Second leg is scheduled on 16 November with the match involving Shturm on 17 November.

|}

Quarterfinals
First leg games were played on 23 November, second leg games on 30 November. Due to mass rocket strike by the Russian Federation on November 23, matches of the first leg were postponed.

|}
Notes:

Semifinals

|}

Final

|}

See also
 2022–23 Ukrainian Football Amateur League

Notes

References

External links
 Official website of the Association of Amateur Football of Ukraine (AAFU)
 Tournament diagram. www.aafu.org.ua

Ukrainian Amateur Cup
Ukrainian Amateur Cup
Amateur Cup
Sports events affected by the 2022 Russian invasion of Ukraine